The following lists events that happened during 1883 in Australia.

Incumbents

Governors
Governors of the Australian colonies:
 Governor of New South Wales – Lord Augustus Loftus
 Governor of Queensland – Sir Arthur Edward Kennedy GCMG CB/Sir Anthony Musgrave GCMG
 Governor of South Australia – Sir William Jervois then Sir William Robinson
 Governor of Tasmania – Major Sir George Strahan
 Governor of Victoria – George Phipps, 2nd Marquess of Normanby

Premiers
Premiers of the Australian colonies:
 Premier of New South Wales – Sir Henry Parkes until 5 January then Alexander Stuart
 Premier of Queensland – Thomas McIlwraith until 13 November then Samuel Griffith
 Premier of South Australia – John Cox Bray
 Premier of Tasmania – William Giblin
 Premier of Victoria – Bryan O'Loghlen until 8 March then James Service

Events
 The J. Boag & Son brewery is established in Launceston, Tasmania.
 12 June – The first Australasian headquarters of the Salvation Army opened in Melbourne.
 14 June – A rail service between Sydney and Melbourne commences when the NSW and Victorian rail systems are joined at Albury.
 1 October – Sydney Boys High School is founded in Sydney, New South Wales. It is the first boys public school in Australia.
 26 November – An Australasian Inter-Colonial Conference is held in Sydney. Federation and annexation of surrounding islands are discussed by the Australian colonies, New Zealand and Fiji.

Exploration and settlement
 Boundary rider Charles Rath discovers the Line of Lode, a massive silver deposit near the town of Broken Hill, New South Wales.

Arts and literature

Sport
 30 January – England defeats Australia 2–1 in the 1882–83 Test cricket series, reclaiming "The Ashes" of English cricket.
November – Martini-Henry wins the Melbourne Cup
2 November –The Northern Rugby Union (later renamed Queensland Rugby Union) is formed at a meeting in Brisbane
Petersham Rugby Union Football Club formed in Sydney NSW

Births
 16 March – Ethel Anderson (died 1958), poet, author, and painter 
 12 April – Dally Messenger, (died 1959), rugby footballer
 15 April – Stanley Bruce (died 1967), 8th Prime Minister of Australia
 30 May – Sandy Pearce (died 1930), rugby league footballer and boxer
 1 July – Micky Dore (died 1910), rugby league footballer
 1 September – Robert Graves (died 1958), rugby footballer
 12 December – William Baylebridge (died 1943), poet and short story writer

Deaths
 5 January – Charles Tompson (born 1806), poet
 18 August – Roger William Bede Vaughan (born 1834), Archbishop of Sydney

References

 
Australia
Years of the 19th century in Australia